Renart the Fox is a 2005 Luxembourgian animated film directed by Thierry Schiel. It was selected as the Luxembourgish entry for the Best Foreign Language Film at the 78th Academy Awards, but it was not nominated.

Cast
 Frédéric Diefenthal as Renart
 Lorànt Deutsch as Rufus
 Marc Bretonnière as Ysengrin
 Denise Metmer as Hersent
 Henri Poirier as King Nobel

See also
 Reynard the Fox
 List of submissions to the 78th Academy Awards for Best Foreign Language Film
 List of Luxembourgish submissions for the Academy Award for Best International Feature Film

References

External links
 

2005 films
2005 animated films
Luxembourgian animated films
2000s French-language films
Animated films about foxes